The FIDE World Cup 2002, marketed as the Second Chess World Cup, was a 24-player Category XVI chess tournament played between 9 October and 22 October 2002 in Hyderabad, India. The tournament was hosted at Ramoji Film City and organized by FIDE in conjunction with the All India Chess Federation. Former World Cup winner Viswanathan Anand defeated Rustam Kasimdzhanov in the final to retain the title.

Format

The tournament began with a league stage, consisting of 4 groups of six players each. Each player played a game against each of the other players in his group once. At the end of the group stage, the top two players from each group progressed to the quarterfinals. In the knockout rounds, each player played a two-game match against his opponent. If the match was tied after the regular games, blitz tie-breaks were used to determine a winner.

Participants
All players are Grandmasters unless indicated otherwise.

 , 2755
 , 2709
 , 2707
 , 2684
 , 2673
 , 2670
 , 2670
 , 2667
 , 2666
 , 2664
 , 2653
 , 2650
 , 2643
 , 2628
 , 2615
 , 2614
 , 2600
 , 2593
 , 2575
 , 2551
 , 2550
 , 2531, IM
 , 2511
 , 2399, IM

Calendar

Group stage

The group stages featured a number of surprising upsets, with the top three seeds all struggling to remain in contention. Anand, the No. 1 seed, overcame an early loss to Krishnan Sasikaran with wins over Kasimdzhanov and Al-Modiahki to finish second in his group. Vassily Ivanchuk was less fortunate, dropping games to Malakhov and Macieja and finishing fifth in Group A. Morozevich never recovered after suffering a disastrous start with three straight losses to Ehlvest, Ganguly, and Harikrishna. He scored only one point in five matches, finishing second-to-last in the entire tournament and dropping below 2700 in Elo rating for the first time since 1998.

Playoffs

Final
In the final, Viswanathan Anand defended his World Cup title won in Shenyang against Rustam Kasimdzhanov in a two-game match. The first game of the match ended in a 16-move draw,  with Kasimdzhanov failing to make any headway against Anand's Caro-Kann defence. In Game 2, Anand gradually outplayed Kasimdzhanov in the Petroff defence, gaining a strong advantage after 18 ... N6g5?. Kasimdzhanov would resign 11 moves later.

References 

2002
2002 in chess
Chess in India
Sports competitions in Hyderabad, India
2002 in Indian sport
International sports competitions hosted by India